Ultimate Collection is a compilation album by the American singer-songwriter Aimee Mann. Released on September 12, 2000, by Hip-O, the album mostly comprises tracks from her first two solo albums and her work with the band 'Til Tuesday.

Release
Mann did not approve the release. In a statement on her website, she said she was not involved and that and she considered it "seriously substandard and misleading". In 2001, Mann sued Universal Music, saying the release breached an agreement in her contract that stipulated that Universal could not release a compilation without her consent. She also said Universal had refused her offer to create artwork for the album and help with the track selection. Mann sought more than $2 million in damages.

Track listing
All tracks written by Aimee Mann unless otherwise noted.
"That's Just What You Are" (Brion, Mann) (1994, from Melrose Place OST) – 4:32
"You Could Make a Killing"  (1995, from I'm with Stupid) – 3:43
"You're with Stupid Now"  (1995, from I'm with Stupid) – 3:27
"Wise Up"  (1996, from Jerry Maguire OST) – 3:27
"Driving with One Hand on the Wheel"  (1995, from "Long Shot" single) – 2:44
"Long Shot"  (1995, from I'm with Stupid) – 3:09
"Choice in the Matter" (Brion, Mann) (1995, from I'm with Stupid) – 3:12
"Voices Carry" (Single Mix) ('Til Tuesday) (1985, from Voices Carry) – 4:21
"Take It Back" (Brion, Mann) (1993, from "I Should've Known" single) – 2:52
"Say Anything" (Brion, Mann) (1993, from Whatever) – 4:57
"Jacob Marley's Chain"  (1993, from Whatever) – 3:01
"Amateur" (Brion, Mann) (1995, from I'm with Stupid) – 4:43
"All Over Now"  (1995, from I'm with Stupid) – 3:38
"Baby Blue" (Pete Ham) (1993, from "I Should've Known" single) – 3:51
"Everything's Different Now" (Shear, Sweet) (1988, from Everything's Different Now) – 3:57
"Sign of Love" (Condos, Goldenberg) (1987, from Back to the Beach OST) – 3:50
"The Other End (Of the Telescope) (Live Version)" (Costello, Mann) (1993, from "Stupid Thing" single) – 4:27
"Jimmy Hoffa Jokes"  (1993, from "Say Anything" single) – 2:30
"Stupid Thing" (Brion, Mann) (1993, from Whatever) – 4:27
"I Should've Known"  (1993, from Whatever) – 4:53

References 

2000 greatest hits albums
Aimee Mann compilation albums
Albums produced by Rhett Davies
Albums produced by John Boylan (record producer)
Albums produced by Jon Brion
Albums produced by Mike Thorne
Unauthorized albums